The 2023–24 Michigan Wolverines men's basketball team will represent the University of Michigan during the 2023–24 NCAA Division I men's basketball season. The season will mark the program's 108th season and its 107th consecutive year as a member of the Big Ten Conference. The Wolverines,will be led by fifth-year head coach Juwan Howard, they will play their home games for the 57th consecutive year at Crisler Center in Ann Arbor, Michigan.

Previous season
The Wolverines finished the 2022–23 season 18–16, 11–9 in Big Ten play to finish in a tie for fifth place. As the No. 9 seed in the Big Ten tournament, they lost to Rutgers in the second round. The Wolverines received and accepted an at-large bid to the 2023 National Invitation Tournament as the No. 3 seed, where they defeated Toledo in the first round before losing to Vanderbilt in the second round.

Offseason

Departures
On March 15, it was revealed that Joey Baker applied for a retroactively redshirt for his freshman season with the 2018–19 Duke Blue Devils.

Recruiting classes
On October 20, 2022, Michigan received its first class of 2023 commitment from four-star center Papa Kante. On November 1, Michigan received its second commitment of the 2023 class, four-star shooting guard George Washington III.

2023 recruiting class

Roster

References

Michigan Wolverines men's basketball seasons
Michigan
Michigan
Michigan